The Golden Disc Awards (formerly spelled the Golden Disk Awards before 2015) is an annual South Korean major music awards ceremony that honors achievements in the local music industry. The awards ceremony was founded with the purpose to promote popular culture creativity, discover new artists, and contribute to the growth of the music industry. The first ceremony was held in 1986.

The 35th Golden Disc Awards was held on 9–10 January 2021 without a live audience due to the ongoing COVID-19 pandemic.

History 
From its inception in 1986, the event was called the Korea Visual and Records Grand Prize Award until 2001, when the event named was changed to the Golden Disk Awards. The spelling was later changed to the Golden Disc Awards in 2015.

The awards ceremony was hosted in South Korea until 2012, when it was hosted in Osaka, Japan. The ceremony was also hosted internationally in Kuala Lumpur, Malaysia in 2013, and in Beijing, China in 2015.

The Golden Disc Awards trophies were designed by sculptor Kim Su-hyeon, a professor at Chungbuk National University. The trophy is in the shape of a woman playing a traditional Korean wind instrument.

Ceremonies

Award categories 
As of the 34th Golden Disc Awards, there were two grand prizes: Album of the Year (also known as Album Daesang) and Digital Song of the Year (also known as Digital Song Daesang). Main prizes (also known as Bonsang) are awarded to multiple artists in both the Album and Digital Song categories. The grand prize winners are chosen from the main prize winners.
Album of the Year (Grand prize)
Song of the Year (Grand prize)
Album Bonsang (Main prize)
Digital Song Bonsang (Main prize)
 Rookie Artist Award
 Popularity Award
 Genre awards
 Special awards
 International Recognition Awards
 Special Recognition Golden Disc Awards
 Other awards

Grand prizes 
All winners are adapted from the Golden Disc Awards website.

Album of the Year (Album Daesang)

Song of the Year (Digital Daesang)

Main prizes 
All winners are adapted from the Golden Disc Awards website.

Album Bonsang

Digital Bonsang

Rookie of the Year Award 
Winners are listed alphabetically by year.

Popularity Award

Genre awards 
All winners are adapted from the Golden Disc Awards website.

Best R&B/Hip-Hop Award

Best Trot Award

Best Ballad Award

Best OST Award

Best Hip-Hop Award

Best Rock Award

Best R&B/Soul Award

Special awards
All winners are adapted from the Golden Disc Awards website.

Best Group Award

Best Solo Artist Award

Performance Award

Artist of the Year Award

Cosmopolitan Artist Award

Next Generation Award

Producer Award

International Recognition Awards

Special Recognition Golden Disc Awards

Other awards

Discontinued awards

Ceci Asia Icon Award

Achievement Award

Music Video Awards

Producer Daesang

Encouragement Award

Other Technical awards

Most awarded artists

Most grand prizes awarded 

This list includes both Album of the Year (Album Daesang) and Digital Song of the Year (Digital Song Daesang) award winners.

Most awarded overall

References

External links 
 Golden Disc Awards official website

 
South Korean music awards
Performing arts trophies
Awards established in 1986
1986 establishments in South Korea
Annual events in South Korea